Rodrigo Ruiz Encina (born 1967) is a Chilean anthropologist.

Ruiz was a founding member and director of the e-newspaper El Desconcierto. Similarly, he is close to Jorge Sharp, mayor of Valparaiso.

References

External links
 Profile at La Fuga

1967 births
Living people
University of Chile alumni
21st-century Chilean politicians
Members of the SurDA Movement
Members of the Autonomist Movement
Social Convergence politicians